The United States Virgin Islands Department of Justice is a department of the United States Virgin Islands government.

Corrections
The Virgin Islands Bureau of Corrections (BOC) operates the territory's correctional facilities.

The Bureau of Corrections maintains a facility in Saint Croix, the Golden Grove Adult Correctional Facility. As of October 1, 2014, 132 sentenced prisoners and 136 non-sentenced prisoners are at Golden Grove. The bureau also maintains jails on the island of St. Thomas: those in  the Alexander Farrelly Criminal Justice Complex (CJC) and the Alva A. Swan Annex.

 the BOC does not have a specific correctional officer training program, and instead has the police department train prison guards.

Corrections history
In 2014 the U.S. Department of Justice asked a federal judge to force the USVI authorities to improve conditions at Golden Grove. Prior to October 1, 2014, due to staffing shortages at Golden Grove, 78 adult prisoners, including 75 sentenced prisoners at Golden Grove and three held at the St. Thomas Jails who were deemed by prison authorities as "behavioral and management concerns", were transferred to the privately operated Citrus County Detention Facility in Citrus County, Florida.

Circa 2013 USVI authorities stated that they were going to improve conditions at the St. Thomas jails, but a 2015 report from David Bogard, a security analysis, stated that the level of staffing since October 2014 had deteriorated.

References

External links

 United States Virgin Islands Department of Justice (Mirror link)

State corrections departments of the United States
Government of the United States Virgin Islands
United States Virgin Islands law